Peter Wilhelm Brand (August 3, 1900 – August 1, 1978) was a German politician of the Christian Democratic Union (CDU) and former member of the German Bundestag.

Life 
Brand was a member of the CDU and belonged to the district executive committee in Remscheid.
Member of Parliament

He was a member of the German Bundestag from 1953 to 1969. From 1964 to 1969 he was deputy chairman of the CDU/CSU parliamentary group. From 1961 to 1969 he was Deputy Chairman of the Bundestag Committee for Economic and SME Issues. Brand initially represented the Rhein-Wupper-Kreis - Leverkusen constituency in parliament, and from 1965 the Remscheid constituency.

Literature

References

1900 births
1978 deaths
Members of the Bundestag for North Rhine-Westphalia
Members of the Bundestag 1965–1969
Members of the Bundestag 1961–1965
Members of the Bundestag 1957–1961
Members of the Bundestag 1953–1957
Members of the Bundestag for the Christian Democratic Union of Germany